Poland competed at the 1966 European Athletics Championships in Budapest, Hungary, from 30 August - 4 September 1966. A delegation of 56 athletes were sent to represent the country.

Medals

References

European Athletics Championships
1966
Nations at the 1966 European Athletics Championships